Pleasant Township is one of nine townships in Johnson County, Indiana. As of the 2010 census, its population was 52,957 and it contained 22,355 housing units.

Pleasant Township was organized in 1829.

Geography

References

External links

 Indiana Township Association
 United Township Association of Indiana

Townships in Johnson County, Indiana
Townships in Indiana
1829 establishments in Indiana
Populated places established in 1829